Montfortista is a genus of sea snails, marine gastropod mollusks in the family Fissurellidae, the keyhole limpets and slit limpets.

Species
Species within the genus Montfortista include:
Montfortista excentrica (Iredale, 1929)
Montfortista kirana (Habe, 1963)
Montfortista oldhamiana ((G. Nevill & H. Nevill, 1869)
Montfortista panhi (Quoy & Gaimard, 1834)

References

External links
 Issel, A. (1869). Malacologia del Mar Rosso. Ricerche zoologiche e paleontologiche. Biblioteca Malacologica, Pisa. xi + 387 pp., pls 1-5 
 Iredale, T. (1929). Queensland molluscan notes, no. 1. Memoirs of the Queensland Museum. 9(3): 261-297, pls 30-31

 To World Register of Marine Species

Fissurellidae
Gastropod genera